Jim Ralph (born May 13, 1962) is a media personality and retired professional hockey player from Sault Ste. Marie, Ontario, Canada.

From 1978 to 1989, he played for numerous Ontario Hockey League and American Hockey League teams, including the Ottawa 67s, the Springfield Indians, and the Newmarket Saints. While playing for the 67's, Ralph started his broadcasting career as a summer fill in announcer on CHAS-FM in the Sault.

Ralph was drafted by the Chicago Black Hawks, 162nd overall, in the 1980 NHL Entry Draft. After a serious knee injury, he turned to broadcasting. Ralph was the colour commentator of the Toronto Maple Leafs on AM640 Toronto Radio from 1997 to 2012, and on Sportsnet 590 The Fan and TSN 1050 since 2013.  His current broadcast partner is Joe Bowen, and his former partners have included Dennis Beyak, and Dan Dunleavy.

External links

 

1962 births
Baltimore Skipjacks players
Canadian radio sportscasters
Canadian ice hockey goaltenders
Chicago Blackhawks draft picks
Colorado Flames players
Ice hockey people from Ontario
Living people
Milwaukee Admirals (IHL) players
National Hockey League broadcasters
Nova Scotia Oilers players
Newmarket Saints players
Ottawa 67's players
Sportspeople from Sault Ste. Marie, Ontario
Springfield Indians players
Toronto Maple Leafs announcers